The 2022 European Wrestling Championships was held from 28 March to 3 April 2022 in Budapest, Hungary. Belarusian and Russian wrestlers did not compete at the event after a ban as a result of the Russian invasion of Ukraine.

Competition schedule
All times are (UTC+1)

Medal table

Team ranking

Medal summary

Men's freestyle

Men's Greco-Roman

Women's freestyle

Participating nations

385 competitors from 37 nations participated:
 (5)
 (14)
 (5)
 (23)
 (24)
 (5)
 (5)
 (2)
 (7)
 (6)
 (6)
 (12)
 (3)
 (20)
 (22)
 (5)
 (25)
 (7)
 (16)
 (1)
 (3)
 (10)
 (19)
 (5)
 (2)
 (3)
 (4)
 (23)
 (1)
 (17)
 (2)
 (12)
 (5)
 (9)
 (3)
 (30)
 (20)

References

External links 
 Database
 Results book

 
Europe
European Wrestling Championships
International wrestling competitions hosted by Hungary
Sports competitions in Budapest
European Wrestling Championships
Wrestling
European Wrestling Championships
European Wrestling Championships